is an operator of inter-city and regional bus lines based in the Tōhoku region of Japan. A subsidiary of the East Japan Railway Company (JR East) group, JR Bus Tohoku is one of eight JR Bus companies within Japan Railways Group (JR Group).

Outline
JR Bus Tohoku was established on 5 March 1988 the same as JR Bus Kanto by splitting from JR East Bus. This bus company was actually established as JR East Bus Tohoku Branch the same as JR East was established on 1 April 1987. This firm operates routes connecting the Tohoku region to the Tokyo metropolitan area and cities within the region, as well as regional routes providing intra-regional service.

Offices 
Aomori branch
Ōminato office
Morioka branch
Kuji office
Ninohe office
Akita branch
Sendai branch
Fukushima branch

Bus routes 
Below-mentioned bullet point summary are bus routes and terminus.

Highway bus 
La foret (ラ・フォーレ) (Aomori - Tokyo)
Rakuchin (らくちん) (Morioka - Ikebukuro / Tokyo)
Dream Chōkai (ドリーム鳥海) (Ugo-Honjō - Tokyo)
Dream Sasanishiki(ドリームササニシキ) (Furukawa / Sendai - Tokyo)
Masamune (政宗) (Sendai - Shinjuku)
Abukuma (あぶくま) (Fukushima / Kōriyama - Shinjuku)
Dream Sakuranbo (ドリームさくらんぼ) (Yamagata - Shinjuku)
Dream Yokohama Sendai (ドリーム横浜・仙台) (Sendai - Shinagawa / Yokohama)
Dream Fukushima Yokohama (ドリームふくしま・横浜) (Fukushima / Kōriyama - Tokyo / Yokohama)
WE Liner (WEライナー) (Sendai - Niigata)
Green Liner (グリーンライナー) (Sendai - Yokote / Ōmagari / Yuzawa)
Sendai Ōdate (仙台・大館号) (Sendai - Hanawa / Ōdate)
Senshū (仙秋) (Sendai - Akita)
Kenji Liner (けんじライナー) (Sendai - Kitakami / Hanamaki)
Urban (アーバン) (Sendai - Morioka)
Umineko (うみねこ) (Sendai - Hachinohe)
Blue City (ブルーシティ) (Sendai - Aomori)
Super YūYū (スーパー湯～遊) (Morioka - Jhōbōji - Ninohe)
Yodel (ヨーデル) (Morioka - Ōwani - Hirosaki)
Sendai - Fukushima
Sendai - Kōriyama
Sendai - Aizu-Wakamatsu
Sendai - Iwaki
Sendai - Furukawa
Sendai - Mizusawa / Esashi
Sendai - Yonezawa

Route bus 
Fukunami Line (福浪線) (Fukushima - Kawamata)
Hayasaka-Kōgen Line (早坂高原線) (Morioka - Iwaizumi)
Hiraniwa-Kōgen Line (平庭高原線) (Morioka - Numakunai - Kuzumaki - Kuji)
Numakunai Line (沼宮内線) (Kuzumaki - Arasawaguchi)
Ninohe Line (二戸線) (Ninohe - Jhōbōji)
Karumai Line (軽米線) (Ninohe - Karumai)
Kozuya Line (小鳥谷線) (Ninohe - Ichinohe - Kozuya - Kuzumaki)
East Towada Line (十和田東線) (Hachinohe - Lake Towada)
North Towada Line (十和田北線) (Aomori - Lake Towada)
Yokouchi Line (横内線) (Aomori - Yokouchi - Moya)
Aomori Airport Line (青森空港線) (Aomori - Aomori Airport)
Shimokita Line(下北線) (Tanabu - Ōminato - Kawauchi - Wakinosawa)

Reference

External links

Bus companies of Japan
Companies based in Miyagi Prefecture
Japanese companies established in 1988